Wallpack Center (also known as Walpack Center) is an unincorporated community located within Walpack Township, Sussex County, New Jersey, United States. Wallpack Center has a post office with ZIP code 07881. It is now part of the Delaware Water Gap National Recreation Area.

History
Wallpack Center was established as a farming community in the mid-1800s. The community, which is located in a rural area, functioned as a service center for the surrounding farms. Due to its isolated location, the community only served farmers within its valley, which could not easily go to other communities for services. In the 1900s, the community declined as larger settlements were able to serve the farms in the region.

The community presently includes the post office, a church, a former school used for storage, and six houses.

Historic district

The Wallpack Center Historic District is a  historic district encompassing the community. It was added to the National Register of Historic Places on July 17, 1980 for its significance in agriculture, architecture, and exploration/settlement. The district includes 8 contributing buildings.

The one-room schoolhouse was built . The Methodist Church was built in 1871 and features Italianate architecture.

References

External links
 
 

Walpack Township, New Jersey
Unincorporated communities in Sussex County, New Jersey
Unincorporated communities in New Jersey
Delaware Water Gap National Recreation Area